Archange Bintsouka is a Congolese footballer who currently plays for Football Superleague of Kosovo club Drenica on loan from Partizani Tirana and the Congo national team.

Club career
Bintsouka played for AS Kondzo of the Congo Premier League. On 1 February 2022 it was revealed that FK Partizani Tirana of the Albanian Kategoria Superiore were finalizing a contract with Bintsouka ahead of the close of the transfer window in Europe.

In August 2022 it was announced that Partizani Tirana had agreed to a 1-year loan for Bintsouka with Football Superleague of Kosovo club Drenica. He scored his first league goal for the club on 27 August 2022 in a 2–1 victory over KF Malisheva.

International career
Bintsouka made his competitive international debut on 21 January 2021 in a 2020 African Nations Championship match against Niger. He went on to make three total appearances in the tournament. Prior to the tournament, he appeared for the Congo in two warmup friendlies against Rwanda on 7 and 10 January.

International career statistics

References

External links

2002 births
Living people
Republic of the Congo footballers
Association football forwards
Republic of the Congo international footballers
Republic of the Congo expatriate footballers
Expatriate footballers in Albania
Republic of the Congo A' international footballers
2020 African Nations Championship players
Republic of the Congo expatriate sportspeople in Albania
FK Partizani Tirana players
AS Kondzo players